Lophocampa debilis is a moth of the family Erebidae. It was described by William Schaus in 1920. It is found in Mexico, Costa Rica and Guatemala.

Description
Male. Body and forewings pale brownish yellow, whitish at base of abdomen dorsally; black points on tegulae; forewings crossed by numerous wavy brown lines; antemedial line defined by grayish shadings, a medial line similarly shaded from subcostal vein to inner margin; a black point on discocellular; a small subterminal dark brown dash between veins 5 and 6, inner margin grayish brown.

Hindwings yellowish white.

Wingspan 31 mm.

Habitat: Cayuga, Guatemala, also in collection from Mexico and Costa Rica.

Altogether paler than Lophocampa citrina Sepp and without the white spot on forewing.

References

 Natural History Museum Lepidoptera generic names catalog

debilis
Moths described in 1920